Peachland is a district municipality in the Okanagan Valley on the west side of Okanagan Lake in British Columbia, Canada. It was founded in 1899 by John Moore Robinson, although the region had long been home to the Okanagan people. Peachland is approximately half-an-hour's drive south of the city of Kelowna and about a 20-minute drive north of Summerland. The Okanagan Valley is very narrow in the area and there are few terraces that mark former lake levels and the former lake bottom. As a result, the city is largely located on a steep sidehill. Like many other areas in the Okanagan, Peachland is rapidly growing, with new residents coming from all across Canada. Across the lake from Peachland is Rattlesnake Island, home of the legendary Ogopogo. Peachland is approximately 370 km from Vancouver, British Columbia, on the British Columbia south coast.

History
Peachland was founded on the site of a tiny community called Camp Hewett.

Demographics 

Ethnicity

Religion 
According to the 2021 census, religious groups in Peachland included:
Irreligion (3,165 persons or 54.9%)
Christianity (2,465 persons or 42.8%)
Judaism (30 persons or 0.5%)
Buddhism (15 persons or 0.3%)
Indigenous Spirituality (15 persons or 0.3%)
Sikhism (10 persons or 0.2%)
Other (60 persons or 1.0%)

Government
Federally, Peachland is, since 2015, within the electoral district of Central Okanagan — Similkameen — Nicola. The current MP is Conservative Dan Albas, elected in the 2011 (in the previous constituency of Okanagan—Coquihalla)Canadian federal election following former MP Stockwell Day's retirement from public life. The local MLA for the area is Dan Ashton. The municipal government of Peachland consists of the mayor and six at-large councillors, elected to three-year terms.

One former councillor, Jean Fraser, was elected in 1995 and served several consecutive terms. In her last election she received the highest number of votes in the municipality's history. Fraser retired from council on November 13, 2011, as she felt the work she could do on council was complete. The current mayor is Patrick Van Minsel who defeated Cindy Fortin by a landslide vote in the 2022 municipal election.

Climate

The climate of Peachland is very similar to that of neighboring Kelowna, but with a greater moderating influence from Okanagan Lake. This is partly due to its proximity to the water, as well as the greater width of the lake in this area (up to 5 kilometres). As most of the city is built into a mountainside, it is typically shielded from cold northerly winds and also has an overall southern exposure. This helps warm the area slightly during spring, summer, and fall, but particularly in winter. Proximity to the lake results in more moderation relative to Okanagan cities that are farther away from it. Average January high temperatures in Peachland are nearly 1.5 degrees warmer than in Kelowna, while the reverse is true in July.

The city's southern orientation provides protection from winds from the north while also encouraging those from the south, which blow across the lake directly toward the city and can cause mild lake-effect snow. The steep mountainside on which Peachland is built can enhance this effect somewhat via the action of orographic lift. Ordinarily, precipitation in the Okanagan generally decreases from north to south, with the city of Vernon receiving approximately 4 more inches of rain and snow per year than the city of Penticton and 2 more inches than Kelowna.

Events and industries
Peachland is home to several events and industries. Hainle Vineyards, the first ice wine maker in North America, operates its organic winery in Peachland. Peachland is the location of the annual Peachland World of Wheels Car Show and the home of the legendary lake monster Ogopogo. Peachland is home to Zipzone Adventure Park, one of the highest zip lines in Canada and the world.

Notable people
George H. V. Bulyea
James B. Hawkes

See also
Peachland Media Gallery
Coquihalla Highway
Highway 97
Highway 97C
Canadian wines

Notes

References

External links

Populated places in the Regional District of Central Okanagan
District municipalities in British Columbia
Populated places on Okanagan Lake
Populated places in the Okanagan Country